The 2000–01 Deutsche Eishockey Liga season was the 7th season since the founding of the Deutsche Eishockey Liga. The Adler Mannheim won the DEL Championship the fourth time in 5 seasons, extending their dominance in German ice hockey. It was also the fifth time in their history they held the German Champion title.

A change was brought to the format of play. The first 8 placed teams in the regular season would go into playoffs, while the season would end for the other teams. There would be no relegation.

Regular season

All teams played each other 4 times, for a total of 60 rounds. The first 8 placed teams qualified for the playoffs.

GP = Games played, W = Win, SOW = Shootout Win, SOL = Shootout Loss, L = Loss
 = Qualified for playoffs  = Season end

Playoff

The playoffs were played in a best-of-five format.

Quarterfinals

Quarterfinals started March 23, 2001.

Semifinals

Semifinals started April 3.

Finals

The DEL finals started on April 14 with a homegame for Adler Mannheim who had a better regular season standing.

The Adler Mannheim extended their dominance by winning the DEL Championship for the 4th time.

References

1
Ger
Deutsche Eishockey Liga seasons